323 Squadron may refer to:

 No. 323 Expeditionary Combat Support Squadron RAAF, Royal Australian Air Force
 323 Squadron RNLAF, a unit of the Royal Netherlands Air Force, based at Eglin Air Force Base
 323d Aero Squadron, an aero squadron in the  Air Service, United States Army
 323d Fighter-Interceptor Squadron, United States Air Force
 323d Strategic Reconnaissance Squadron, United States Air Force
 VMFA-323, United States Marine Corps